"Size Seven Round (And Made of Gold)" is a song by American country artists George Jones featuring Lacy J. Dalton.  It was a minor hit in 1985, reaching #19 on the country Billboard survey.  The song was included on Jones' 1984 LP Ladies' Choice and later on the 2005 Sony reissue of My Very Special Guests.  Dalton would also appear on George's 1985 LP Who's Gonna Fill Their Shoes.

Chart performance

References

1984 songs
Song recordings produced by Billy Sherrill
Epic Records singles